A set of three Additional Forces Acts of July 1803 created an Army of Reserve for the defence of the United Kingdom of Great Britain and Ireland against the imminent threat of sea-borne invasion by Napoleon's French Revolutionary Army. A total of 15,780 men were added to the country's armed forces by these compulsory measures, creating an "Army of Reserve".

The acts – one each for England (43 Geo. 3 c. 82), Scotland (c. 83)  and Ireland (c. 85) – were passed by William Pitt the Younger despite strong political opposition.

See also
List of British fencible regiments

References

Napoleonic Wars
United Kingdom Acts of Parliament 1803
19th-century military history of the United Kingdom
United Kingdom military law
British defence policymaking